Andrée Brendheden (born Andrée Persson; January 12, 1983) is a Swedish professional ice hockey forward who currently plays for Rögle BK in the Swedish Elitserien.

References

External links

1983 births
Swedish ice hockey right wingers
Södertälje SK players
Rögle BK players
Living people